Koivisto may refer to:

Surname
 Koivisto (surname)

Places
 Beryozovye Islands (formerly named Koivisto)
 Primorsk, Leningrad Oblast (formerly named Koivisto)